The  opened in Tottori, Japan, in 1949. The building in which the museum is housed was designated a Registered Tangible Cultural Property in 2012.

See also

 Japanese Folk Crafts Museum
 Folk Cultural Properties
 Japanese handicrafts

References

Folk art museums and galleries in Japan
Museums in Tottori Prefecture
Tottori (city)
Museums of Japanese art
Museums established in 1949
1949 establishments in Japan
Mingei
Registered Tangible Cultural Properties